The Order of the Norwegian Lion was a Norwegian order of knighthood established by King Oscar II on 21 January 1904, "in memory of the glorious events associated with Norway’s venerable Coat of Arms".

The order was established as an equivalent in rank to the Swedish Order of the Seraphim as knights of the Norwegian Order of St. Olav ranked below the knights of the Seraphim in the shared Swedish-Norwegian royal court. However the expansion of the Norwegian honours system received mixed reactions amongst Norwegian politicians.

The Union between Sweden and Norway was dissolved in 1905 before any Norwegian knights had been appointed and King Haakon VII chose not to appoint any new knights. He formally repealed the order in a Court resolution on 11 March 1952. The last living knight was King Gustaf VI Adolf of Sweden, who died in 1973.

Complete list of knights

Honorary Knights

King Haakon VII formally became Grand Master on 18 November 1905, but never wore any of the order's insignias.

References 

Norwegian Lion
Awards established in 1904
1904 establishments in Norway